Allison Haunss is a reporter for the CW11, New York.  She previously worked as an anchor at News 12 Connecticut.

Nominations and awards 

In 2004, Haunss received awards for 'Best Broadcast of the Year' and also 'Best Prepared Report - TV Feature of the Year' by the Connecticut Press Club for a segment titled "Grandma Guard".

In 2002, Haunss again received awards from the Connecticut Press Club, again for 'Best Broadcast of the Year' and also 'Best Special Reporting Series - TV Investigative' for two different reports.

Haunss was also nominated for a 2006 Emmy Award by the National Academy of Television Arts & Sciences-New York City in the category Historical/Cultural (news) for a piece she did for News 12 Connecticut entitled "Day Laborers" which aired on October 7, 2005.

References 

New York (state) television reporters
Television anchors from New York City
American reporters and correspondents
American television journalists
American women television journalists
Year of birth missing (living people)
Living people
21st-century American women